Ducey is a former commune in the Manche department in north-western France. On 1 January 2016, it was merged into the new commune of Ducey-Les Chéris. It is noted for its old bridge dating from 1613, which allowed pilgrims to cross the Sélune on the way to Mont Saint-Michel.

See also
Communes of the Manche department

References

Former communes of Manche